Warsan or Warisan is a locality in Dubai, United Arab Emirates (UAE). Warsan is an industrial neighbourhood of Dubai, bordering Al Warqaa to the north and Nad Al Sheba to the west. Warsan is subdivided into four localities — Warsan 1, Warsan 2, Warsan 3 and Warsan 4. The community is sparsely populated and is predominantly industrial, with the Dubai Sewage and Treatment Plant located in it. The new development, Dubai International City, will occupy much of the community.

Other landmarks in the locality include Desert Palm Dubai, Al Aweer Power Station and Warsan Lake. Warsan is bounded to the north by route E 44 (Al Awir Road) and to the west by route E 311 (Emirates Road).

References 

Communities in Dubai